Mariah Carey: Live in Concert was an Asian concert tour by American singer-songwriter Mariah Carey.

Background 

Originally due to take place in February 2018 with tour dates in Australia and New Zealand, Carey rescheduled the tour to October 2018. In a statement issued by promoter MJR Group, the reason for the change was "due to a necessary realignment of her international engagements for 2018." The revised schedule also meant changes to some venues and the cancellation of the Perth show. Concert dates for the Asian leg of the tour were later added in the spring, however it was announced in August 2018 that rescheduled Oceania leg of the tour was cancelled due to scheduling conflicts.

Set list 

 "Fly Away (Butterfly Reprise)" (Intro)
"Honey"
 "Shake It Off"
 "Make It Happen"
 "Make It Happen / Sweetheart / Say Somethin' / Loverboy / Dreamlover" (Performed by background singers)
 "Fantasy" (Bad Boy Fantasy)
 "Always Be My Baby"
 "Vision of Love"
 "Emotions"
"Emotions Reprise" (Band introductions)
"Migrate" (Dancer introductions)
 "#Beautiful" (With Daniel Moore)
 "One Sweet Day" (With Daniel Moore and Trey Lorenz)
 "Can't Let Go"
 "With You"
 "My All"
"I'm That Chick" (Performed by background dancers)
 "It's Like That" (With elements of "Hollis Crew" and "Sucker M.C.'s" by Run-DMC)
 "Love Hangover / Heartbreaker"
 "Touch My Body"
 "We Belong Together"
 "Hero"
"Hero Reprise" (Outro)

Notes:

"Love Hangover / Heartbreaker" was not performed in Kuala Lumpur, Osaka, Tokyo and Bangkok.
The "I'm That Chick" interlude was replaced by "Rock with You" performed by Trey Lorenz in Kuala Lumpur.
"With You" was replaced by "Love Takes Time" in Kuala Lumpur, Shenzhen and Shanghai.
In Macau, Mariah's children Moroccan and Monroe joined her on stage during the performance of "Hero".
"#Beautiful" was replaced by "Don’t Forget About Us" in Shenzhen.
The "Hero Reprise" outro was replaced by "Butterfly Reprise" in Kuala Lumpur, Taipei, Macau and Shenzhen.
"All I Want for Christmas Is You" was performed as an encore in Osaka and Tokyo.
"Can't Let Go" was replaced by "The Distance" in Tokyo, Singapore, Magelang and Bangkok.
"Vision of Love" was replaced by "Love Takes Time" in Singapore and Magelang.
An a cappella snippet of "Through the Rain" was performed in Magelang.
"With You" was replaced by "I Don't Wanna Cry" in Magelang. 
"Touch My Body" was replaced by "Don't Forget About Us" in Magelang.
"Vision of Love" was replaced by "Fly Like a Bird" in Bangkok.
"One Sweet Day" was not performed in Bangkok.

Shows

Cancelled shows

References 

2018 concert tours
Mariah Carey concert tours